Giorgos Zampetas (Pronounced 'Zabetas', sometimes romanized as George Zambetas / George Zabetas / Giorgos Zabetas; 25 January 1925 – 10 March 1992) was a Greek bouzouki musician. He was born and died in Athens but his origins were from the island of Kythnos.

Early years
Giorgos Zampetas, Greek music composer, singer and one of the greatest bouzouki artists was born in Metaxourgio area of Athens, on 25 January 1925. His parents were Mihalis Zampetas, a barber, and Marika Moraiti, the niece of a well-known baritone of those years.

From a very young age, Zampetas showed a great interest in music: as he was helping his father in his barber shop, he secretly played his first melodies on a bouzouki. Anything that was producing sound seemed exciting to him and helped him in his compositions, as he said in his biography not long before he died. In 1932, as a seven year old first grader, he won his first prize, playing his first song in a school competition. At the young age of 13, Giorgos met one of the most famous figures in Greek music, and one of his idols, Vassilis Tsitsanis which played a fundamental role in his musical career.

During the German occupation of Greece, in times of poverty and misery, Zampetas founded his first band in 1942, after having moved to the Egaleo neighborhood of Athens, 2 years prior to that.

Career
He was one of the most recognized Greek musicians of all times, working in the Greek cinema of those years with stars such as Aliki Vouyouklaki. He appeared in many Greek film productions, and his compositions used in many, one of the most famous being "Siko Horepse Sirtaki". He also worked with famous Greek composers, such as Manos Hadjidakis in 1959, and there after collaborated with various leading Greek musicians such as Theodorakis, Stavros Xarchakos and many others.

Later years 
Despite the struggles of the past decade, due to changes in music fashion, the 1990s brought about new records and releases by Zampetas. However, not too long after his brief revival, by 1992, he had reached not only the twilight of his career, but his life too. In early 1992, his health deteriorated and was diagnosed with bone cancer, which had already reached advanced stages. Prior to that, he had made one final appearance, before his eventual death.

Death 
Zampetas died of bone cancer at the age of 67, in the Sotiria Hospital of Athens.  He was survived by family in Greece, as well as extended family members throughout the Greek diaspora, including the enigmatic young great grand niece Maranthy Zabeta.

Legacy 
He is recognised as one of the most famous and most significant composers, and musicians that have contributed to the Greek Laïko music genre.

His former neighbourhood of Egaleo (where he had spent his late teen years, and early twenties) honoured Zampetas by naming the town square in his name, to commemorate him in September 1990.

Songs 
Below is a brief list of some of Zampetas' most recognisable songs; in brackets are the year of creation and the name of the lyricist:

Το κουτούκι (1960, Eftihia Papagianopoulou)
Δεν έχει δρόμο να διαβώ (1963, Dimitris Christodoulou)
Κι αν θα διαβείς τον ουρανό (1964, Dimitris Christodoulou)
Πόρτα κλειστή τα χείλη σου (1964, Dimitris Christodoulou)
Τα δειλινά (1964, Charalampos Vasiliadis)
Ξημερώματα (1965, Dimitris Christodoulou)
Με το βοριά (1965, Dimitris Christodoulou)
Μεσάνυχτα που θα σε βρω (1965, Dimitris Christodoulou)
Σήκω χόρεψε συρτάκι (1965, Alekos Sakelarios)
Χαμόγελο (1965, Alekos Sakelarios)
Το Φανταράκι (1965, Γ. Φέρρης, στη ταινία "Μερικές το προτιμούν χακί") 
Η Κυριακή (1965, Alekos Sakelarios)
Θεσσαλονίκη (1965, Elias Eliopoulos)
Πάρε τον δρόμο τον παλιό (1966, Dimitris Christodoulou)
Δημήτρη μου Δημήτρη μου (1966, Alekos Sakelarios)
Σταλιά, σταλιά (1967, Dionisis Jeffronis)
Ποιος είναι αυτός (1968, Pythagoras)
Έρχομαι έρχομαι (1968, Pythagoras)
Τι να φταίει (1969, Dimitris Christodoulou)
Αγωνία (1970, Charalambos Vasiliadis)

Songs of Giorgos Zampetas that other artists have sung
 ΑΠΟ ΑΥΓΟΥΣΤΟ ΣΕ ΜΑΗ – Στ. Κόκοτας 
 ΓΕΙΑ ΣΟΥ ΦΙΛΕ – Μανταλένα 
 ΤΟ ΧΑΜΟΓΕΛΟ – Δημ.Παπαμιχαήλ 
 ΟΙ ΜΑΧΑΛΑΔΕΣ – Στ. Κόκοτας 
 ΕΙΝΑΙ ΤΟ ΣΤΡΩΜΑ ΜΟΥ ΜΟΝΟ – Αλίκη Βουγιουκλάκη 
 ΔΕΝ ΕΙΝΑΙ ΔΡΟΜΟΣ Η ΚΑΡΔΙΑ – Δημ.Παπαμιχαήλ 
 ΝΑ ΠΑΣ ΝΑ ΠΕΙΣ ΤΗΣ ΜΑΝΑΣ ΜΟΥ – Πόλυ Πάνου & Αντ.Κλειδωνιάρης 
 ΣΤΟ ΠΑΓΕΡΟ ΞΗΜΕΡΩΜΑ – Μανταλένα & Μάριος 
 ΣΤΗΣ ΑΓΗΣ ΤΟ ΠΑΡΑΘΥΡΙ – Δημ.Παπαμιχαήλ 
 Ο ΤΖΩΝΝΥ Ο ΦΙΓΟΥΡΑΤΖΗΣ – Ελένη Ροδά 
 ΤΑ ΔΑΚΡΥΑ – Βίκυ Μοσχολιου 
 ΒΑΘΕΙΑ ΣΤΗ ΘΑΛΑΣΣΑ ΘΑ ΠΕΣΩ – Στ. Καζαντζίδης 
 ΡΕΜΠΕΤΙΚΗ ΣΕΡΕΝΑΤΑ – Στρ. Παγιουμτζής & Γ.Ζαμπέτας 
 ΤΟ ΔΙΑΤΑΓΜΑ – Γιώργος Ζαμπέτας 
 ΒΟΥΡΚΩΜΕΝΗ ΔΕΥΤΕΡΑ – Ελένη Ροδά 
 ΠΑΡΕ ΤΟ ΔΡΟΜΟ ΤΟΝ ΠΑΛΙΟ – Βίκυ Μοσχολιου 
 ΝΥΧΤΕΡΙΝΕΣ ΙΣΤΟΡΙΕΣ – Στ. Κόκοτας 
 Ο ΜΙΣΤΟΚΛΗΣ – Ελένη Ροδά 
 Ο ΔΡΟΜΟΣ Ο ΠΛΑΤΥΣ – Βίκυ Μοσχολιού 
 ΜΕΣΑΝΥΧΤΑ ΠΟΥ ΝΑ ΒΡΩ – Στ. Καζαντζίδης & Μαρινέλλα 
 ΕΝΑΝ ΑΗΤΟ ΑΓΑΠΗΣΑ – Μπέμπα Μπλανς 
 ΔΗΜΗΤΡΗ ΜΟΥ, ΔΗΜΗΤΡΗ ΜΟΥ – Αλίκη Βουγιουκλάκη 
 Ο ΦΟΥΚΑΡΑΣ – Ελένη Ροδά 
 ΕΝΑ ΒΡΑΔΥ ΣΤΟ ΘΗΣΕΙΟ – Δήμητρα Παπίου 
 Η ΚΥΡΙΑΚΗ – Αλίκη Βουγιουκλάκη & Χορωδία 
 ΕΞΟΥΣΙΑ ΑΝ ΜΟΥ ΔΙΝΑΝΕ – Ελένη Ροδά 
 ΤΟ ΓΛΥΚΟΧΑΡΑΜΑ – Γρ.Μπιθικώτσης, Π.Πάνου & Αντ.Κλειδωνιάρης 
 ΜΕ ΤΟ ΒΟΡΙΑ – Στ. Καζαντζίδης & Μαρινέλλα 
 ΠΟΡΤΑ ΚΛΕΙΣΤΗ ΤΑ ΧΕΙΛΗ ΣΟΥ – Βίκυ Μοσχολιού 
 ΜΙΑΣ ΠΕΝΤΑΡΑΣ ΝΙΑΤΑ – Μπέμπα Μπλανς 
 ΕΡΧΟΜΑΙ ΕΡΧΟΜΑΙ – Στ. Κόκοτας 
 ΤΟ ΑΝΘΡΩΠΑΚΙ – Ελένη Ροδά 
 ΑΥΤΟΙ ΠΟΥ ΦΕΥΓΟΥΝ – Γιάννης Πουλόπουλος 
 ΑΚΟΥ Τ ΑΗΔΟΝΙΑ – Μαίρη Λίντα 
 ΤΟ ΠΕΡΙΣΤΕΡΙ – Δημ.Παπαμιχαήλ 
 ΤΕΛΕΥΤΑΙΑ ΑΓΑΠΗ – Στ. Κόκοτας 
 ΤΟ ΠΑΓΩΜΕΝΟ ΧΕΡΙ ΣΟΥ – Βίκυ Μοσχολιού 
 ΤΟ ΘΕΜΑ ΕΙΝΑΙ ΝΑ ΤΗ ΒΡΩ – Στ. Κόκοτας 
 ΠΟΙΟ ΜΟΝΟΠΑΤΙ ΝΑ ΔΙΑΒΑΒΩ – Βίκυ Μοσχολιού 
 ΕΓΩ ΕΙΜΑΙ Η ΕΛΕΝΗ – Ελένη Ροδά 
 ΣΑΝ ΣΗΜΕΡΑ, ΣΑΝ ΣΗΜΕΡΑ – Πρ.Τσαουσάκης & Μαρία Γρίλλη 
 ΟΤΑΝ ΘΑ ΛΑΒΕΙΣ ΑΥΤΟ ΤΟ ΓΡΑΜΜΑ – Μανώλης Καναρίδης 
 Ο ΠΡΩΤΑΘΛΗΤΗΣ – Γιώργος Ζαμπέτας 
 ΚΟΛΑΣΗ – Γιώργος Ζαμπέτας 
 ΔΕ ΜΟΥ ΚΑΙΓΕΤΑΙ ΚΑΡΦΑΚΙ – Γιώργος Ζαμπέταςδε μου κεγετε καρφακι 
 ΓΙΩΡΓΟ ΓΙΩΡΓΑΚΗ – Γιώργος Ζαμπέτας 
 Ο ΚΥΡ ΑΛΕΚΟΣ – Γιώργος Ζαμπέτας 
 ΕΤΣΙ ΚΙ ΑΛΛΙΩΣ ΚΙ ΑΛΛΙΩΤΙΚΑ – Γιώργος Ζαμπέτας 
 ΤΟ ΜΑΛΛΙ – Γιώργος Ζαμπέτας 
 ΔΙΑΒΟΛΙΚΕΣ ΠΕΝΙΕΣ – Ορχηστρικό 
 Η ΚΟΥΛΤΟΥΡΑ – Γιώργος Ζαμπέτας 
 ΖΟΥΛΑ ΣΕ ΜΙΑ ΒΑΡΚΑ ΜΠΗΚΑ – Γιώργος Ζαμπέτας 
 Ο ΑΓΑΘΟΚΛΗΣ – Γιώργος Ζαμπέτας 
 ΑΝ ΜΑΣ ΣΠΑΣΟΥΝ ΤΟ ΜΠΟΥΖΟΥΚΙ – Γιώργος Ζαμπέτας & Ελένη Ροδά 
 ΤΟ ΡΑΔΙΚΙ – Γιώργος Ζαμπέτας 
 ΠΑΤΕΡΑ ΚΑΤΣΕ ΦΡΟΝΙΜΑ – Γιώργος Ζαμπέτας 
 Ο ΠΡΩΘΥΠΟΥΡΓΟΣ – Γιώργος Ζαμπέτας 
 Ο ΓΙΑΝΝΑΚΗΣ – Γιώργος Ζαμπέτας & Χορωδία 
 ΧΙΛΙΑ ΠΕΡΙΣΤΕΡΙΑ – Γιώργος Ζαμπέτας 
 Ο ΠΕΝΗΝΤΑΡΗΣ – Γιώργος Ζαμπέτας 
 ΣΤΟ ΛΕΥΚΟ ΤΟΝ ΠΥΡΓΟ – Γιώργος Ζαμπέτας 
 ΟΙ ΘΑΛΑΣΣΙΝΟΙ – Γιώργος Ζαμπέτας 
 ΜΑΛΙΣΤΑ ΚΥΡΙΕ – Γιώργος Ζαμπέτας 
 ΟΤΑΝ ΣΥΜΒΕΙ ΣΤΑ ΠΕΡΙΞ – Γιώργος Ζαμπέτας 
 ΠΟΥ 'ΣΑΙ ΘΑΝΑΣΗ – Γιώργος Ζαμπέτας 
 ΟΤΑΝ ΚΑΠΝΙΖΕΙ Ο ΛΟΥΛΑΣ – Γιώργος Ζαμπέτας 
 ΤΟ ΦΑΝΤΑΡΑΚΙ – Γιώργος Ζαμπέτας 
 ΜΕ ΤΟ ΧΡΗΜΑ, ΜΕ ΤΟ ΧΡΗΜΑ – Γιώργος Ζαμπέτας 
 ΚΥΡ ΔΑΣΚΑΛΕ – Γιώργος Ζαμπέτας 
 ΕΠΕΜΒΑΙΝΕΙΣ – Γιώργος Ζαμπέτας 
 Ο ΤΖΑΚ Ο' ΧΑΡΑ – Γιώργος Ζαμπέτας 
 ΤΟ ΣΑΡΑΒΑΛΑΚΙ – Γιώργος Ζαμπέτας 
 Σ' ΑΥΤΕΣ ΤΙΣ ΣΤΡΑΤΕΣ – Γιώργος Ζαμπέτας 
 Ο ΑΠΟΓΟΝΟΣ – Γιώργος Ζαμπέτας 
 Η ΠΑΛΙΟΠΑΡΕΑ – Γιώργος Ζαμπέτας 
 ΤΟ ΠΙΤΣΙΡΙΚΙ – Γιώργος Ζαμπέτας 
 ΑΠΟΣΠΑΣΜΑΤΑ ΑΠΟ ΕΡΩΤΕΣ – Γιώργος Ζαμπέτας 
 ΑΓΩΝΙΑ – Τόλης Βοσκόπουλος 
 ΗΡΘΑ ΚΙ ΑΠΟΨΕ ΣΤΑ ΣΚΑΛΟΠΑΤΙΑ ΣΟΥ – Πάνος Τζανετής 
 ΑΛΗΤΗ – Βίκυ Μοσχολιού 
 ΣΤΑΛΙΑ, ΣΤΑΛΙΑ – Μαρινέλλα 
 ΘΕΣΣΑΛΟΝΙΚΗ – Δημήτρης Μητροπάνος 
 ΠΟΥ ΠΑΣ ΧΩΡΙΣ ΑΓΑΠΗ – Δούκισσα 
 ΧΑΘΗΚΕΣ (ΔΕΝ ΕΧΕΙ ΔΡΟΜΟ ΝΑ ΔΙΑΒΩ) – Πάνος Τζανετής 
 ΕΧΑΣΕΣ ΤΟ ΤΡΕΝΟ – Τόλης Βοσκόπουλος 
 ΤΙ ΝΑ ΦΤΑΙΕΙ – Μαρινέλλα 
 Ο ΠΙΟ ΚΑΛΟΣ Ο ΜΑΘΗΤΗΣ – Γιώργος Ζαμπέτας 
 ΤΟ ΚΑΡΑΒΙ – Μπέμπα Μπλανς & Νίκος Βελιώτης 
 ΘΑ ΤΡΑΓΟΥΔΗΣΩ ΓΙΑ ΣΕΝΑ – Πάνος Τζανετής 
 ΠΟΥ ΗΣΟΥΝΑ ΚΑΙ ΧΑΘΗΚΕΣ (ΟΝΕΙΡΟ) – Βίκυ Μοσχολιού 
 Ο ΞΕΝΥΧΤΗΣ – Δημήτρης Μητροπάνος & Σόφη Ζανίνου 
 Η ΒΑΛΙΤΣΑ – Τόλης Βοσκόπουλος 
 ΤΟ ΓΡΑΜΜΑ ΚΑΙ Η ΦΩΤΟΓΡΑΦΙΑ – Βίκυ Μοσχολιού 
 ΒΑΡΥΧΕΙΜΩΝΙΕΣ – Μανταλένα 
 ΣΥΧΝΑ ΜΕ ΤΟ ΔΕΙΛΙ – Πέτρος Αναγνωστάκης, Ρία Κούρτη & Α/φοί Κατσάμπα 
 ΠΟΙΟΣ ΕΙΝ' ΑΥΤΟΣ – Μαρινέλλα 
 Ο ΑΡΑΠΗΣ (ΜΕΛΑΜΨΕΣ ΒΕΔΟΥΪΝΕΣ) – Μανώλης Καναρίδης 
 Η ΜΟΝΤΕΡΝΑ ΑΘΗΝΑ – Δούκισσα 
 ΣΗΚΩ ΧΟΡΕΨΕ ΣΥΡΤΑΚΙ – Ορχηστρικό (στο μπουζούκι ο Γ.Ζαμπέτας) 
 ΒΟΡΙΑΣ ΕΙΝ' Η ΑΓΑΠΗ ΣΟΥ – Ορχηστρικό (στο μπουζούκι ο Γ.Ζαμπέτας) 
 ΤΙ ΓΛΥΚΟ ΝΑ Σ' ΑΓΑΠΟΥΝ – Ορχηστρικό (στο μπουζούκι ο Γ.Ζαμπέτας) 
 ΧΑΘΗΚΕΣ (ΔΕΝ ΕΧΕΙ ΔΡΟΜΟ ΝΑ ΔΙΑΒΩ) – Ορχηστρικό (στο μπουζούκι ο Γ.Ζαμπέτας) 
 ΡΩΜΙΟΣ ΑΓΑΠΗΣΕ ΡΩΜΙΑ – Ορχηστρικό (στο μπουζούκι ο Γ.Ζαμπέτας) 
 ΑΓΩΝΙΑ – Ορχηστρικό (στο μπουζούκι ο Γ.Ζαμπέτας) 
 ΤΑ ΔΕΙΛΙΝΑ – Ορχηστρικό (στο μπουζούκι ο Γ.Ζαμπέτας) 
 ΞΗΜΕΡΩΜΑΤΑ – Ορχηστρικό (στο μπουζούκι ο Γ.Ζαμπέτας) 
 ΠΑΕΙ-ΠΑΕΙ – Ορχηστρικό (στο μπουζούκι ο Γ.Ζαμπέτας) 
 ΑΥΤΟΙ ΠΟΥ ΜΕΝΟΥΝ ΚΑΙ ΑΥΤΟΙ ΠΟΥ ΦΕΥΓΟΥΝ – Ορχηστρικό (στο μπουζούκι ο Γ.Ζαμπέτας) 
 Σ' ΑΥΤΕΣ ΤΙΣ ΣΤΡΑΤΕΣ – Ορχηστρικό (στο μπουζούκι ο Γ.Ζαμπέτας) 
 ΧΑΡΑΥΓΗ – Ορχηστρικό (στο μπουζούκι ο Γ.Ζαμπέτας) 
 ΤΟ ΜΠΟΥΖΟΥΚΙ ΜΟΥ ΚΙ ΕΓΩ – Ορχηστρικό (στο μπουζούκι ο Γ.Ζαμπέτας) 
 ΜΠΟΥΖΟΥΚΙ ΑΓΑΠΗ ΜΟΥ – Ορχηστρικό (στο μπουζούκι ο Γ.Ζαμπέτας) 
 ΑΛΕΓΚΡΟ ΜΠΟΥΖΟΥΚΙ – Ορχηστρικό (στο μπουζούκι ο Γ.Ζαμπέτας) 
 ΧΑΣΑΠΟΣΕΡΒΙΚΟΣ – Ορχηστρικό (στο μπουζούκι ο Γ.Ζαμπέτας) 
 ΤΣΙΦΤΕΤΕΛΙ – Ορχηστρικό (στο μπουζούκι ο Γ.Ζαμπέτας) 
 ΖΕΪΜΠΕΚΙΚΟΣ – Ορχηστρικό (στο μπουζούκι ο Γ.Ζαμπέτας) 
 ΧΑΣΑΠΙΚΟ (κλασικό) – Ορχηστρικό (στο μπουζούκι ο Γ.Ζαμπέτας) 
 ΑΥΤΟΣΧΕΔΙΑΣΜΟΣ ΣΕ ΜΑΤΖΟΡΕ (Ουζάμ) – Ορχηστρικό (στο μπουζούκι ο Γ.Ζαμπέτας) 
 ΑΥΤΟΣΧΕΔΙΑΣΜΟΣ ΣΕ ΜΑΤΖΟΡΕ (Ραστ) – Ορχηστρικό (στο μπουζούκι ο Γ.Ζαμπέτας) 
 ΑΥΤΟΣΧΕΔΙΑΣΜΟΣ ΣΕ ΜΙΝΟΡΕ (Νιαβέντη) – Ορχηστρικό (στο μπουζούκι ο Γ.Ζαμπέτας) 
 ΠΟΛΥΞΕΝΗ – Γιώργος Ζαμπέτας 
 ΛΟΥΝΑ ΠΑΡΚ – Αλίκη Βουγιουκλάκη 
 ΤΙ ΣΟΥ 'ΚΑΝΑ ΚΑΙ ΜΕ ΕΓΚΑΤΕΛΕΙΨΕΣ – Πάνος Τζανετής 
 ΜΕΤΑΞΟΥΡΓΕΙΟ – Δημήτρης Μητροπάνος 
 ΠΕΙΡΑΙΑ ΜΟΥ – Γιώργος Ζαμπέτας 
 ΜΙΑ ΚΥΡΙΑΚΗ ΣΤΟ ΓΙΟΥΣΟΥΡΟΥΜ – Γιάννης Ντουνιάς 
 ΚΑΤΙΝΑ, ΚΑΤΙΝΟΥΛΑ, ΚΑΤΙΝΑΚΙ – Πέτρος Αναγνωστάκης, Κ.Τζοβάρα & Στ.Χατζιδάκης 
 ΤΟ ΑΔΙΕΞΟΔΟ – Βίκυ Μοσχολιού 
 ΒΡΑΖΙΛΙΑΝΑ ΜΟΥ ΓΛΥΚΙΑ – Πέτρος Αναγνωστάκης & Ρία Κούρτη 
 ΕΝΑΣ ΤΑΞΙΔΙΩΤΗΣ – Μαρινέλλα 
 ΝΑ ΞΑΝΑΚΟΥΣΩ ΤΗ ΛΑΤΕΡΝΑ – Γιώργος Ζαμπέτας 
 ΕΙΧΑ ΤΟΝ ΗΛΙΟ ΣΥΝΤΡΟΦΙΑ – Ζωζώ Σαπουντζάκη 
 ΞΑΝΑΣΜΙΓΟΥΝ Τ' ΑΗΔΟΝΙΑ – Πάνος Τζανετής 
 Ο ΣΠΥΡΟΣ – Δημήτρης Μητροπάνος 
 ΑΝΕΒΑΙΝΩ ΚΑΙ ΔΕ ΦΤΑΝΩ – Γιάννης Ντουνιάς & Σόφη Ζανίνου 
 ΑΓΑΠΗ ΜΟΥ, ΑΓΑΠΗ ΜΟΥ – Αλίκη Βουγιουκλάκη 
 ΝΑ ΧΕΙΣ ΧΑΣΕΙ ΤΗΝ ΑΓΑΠΗ ΚΑΙ ΝΑ ΕΙΣΑΙ ΦΤΩΧΗ – Ρία Κούρτη 
 ΜΕΞΙΚΑΝΑ – Πέτρος Αναγνωστάκης 
 Η ΨΙΧΑΛΑ – Αννα Χρυσάφη & Διαμαντής Πανάρετος 
 ΜΑΝΑ ΗΡΘΑΝΕ ΛΗΣΤΕΣ – Γιώργος Ζαμπέτας

General references
«And the rain fell straight through, The life of Giorgos Zampetas»-Ioanna Kliasiou 1994,  «Ντέφι» publications (Στέλιος Ελληνιάδης).
«Τέχνης έργα και πρόσωπα του Αιγάλεω»- Aegaleo Municipality publications 2006

External links
 

1925 births
1992 deaths
Greek laïko singers
20th-century Greek male singers
Singers from Athens